WCSX (94.7 MHz) is a commercial FM radio station licensed to Birmingham, Michigan, and serving Metro Detroit.  It broadcasts a classic rock radio format and is owned by the Beasley Broadcast Group.  The studios and transmitter are on Radio Plaza in Ferndale.  Despite its call sign, WCSX is not affiliated with the CSX Corporation.

WCSX transmits its signal from a tower at 951 feet in height above average terrain (HAAT) with an effective radiated power (ERP) of 13,500 watts. Five other Detroit radio stations transmit their signal from the same tower.  WCSX broadcasts using HD Radio technology.  Its HD-2 digital subchannel carries Fox Sports Radio programming, known as "The Roar" which feeds FM translators at 93.5 and 99.9 MHz.  The HD-3 subchannel plays Christian Contemporary music from the Smile FM network.

History

MOR (1958-1972) 
Its original call sign was WHFI ("Whiffieland"), featuring a Middle of the Road (MOR) format. The disc jockeys included Lee Alan (formerly of 1270 WXYZ). 

The original FCC construction permit for WHFI was issued to Garvin H. Meadowcroft, President of Meadowcroft Broadcasting, Inc. on January 18, 1957 with an address of 1095 Badder Road in Troy, Michigan.  Meadowcroft began broadcasting on WHFI with an office address at 139 Maple in Birmingham.

Oldies (1972-1976) 
In 1972, WHFI shifted to a syndicated oldies format provided by Draper-Blore called "Olde Golde."  The programming was automated with no DJs.  It featured hits of the 1950s and 1960s, similar to Drake-Chenault's "Solid Gold" format except without the softer current hits that the Solid Gold format played.  

In July 1973, Greater Media bought the station.  The "Olde Golde" format evolved the following year into all-oldies.  The call letters were changed to WHNE, "Honey Radio."  Sister station 560 WQTE changed its call sign to WHND and began shadowcasting the format in 1974.  WQTE continued as "Honey Radio" until 1994, by which time 94.7 FM had gone through several changes.  Honey Radio was originally automated using Drake-Chenault's "Classic Gold" format, but transitioned to live personalities (on AM 560 only) around 1980.

Soft Adult Contemporary (1976-1987) 
In 1976, WHNE became WMJC, "Magic 95," with a Soft Adult Contemporary format modeled after Greater Media's successful WMGK in Philadelphia.  DJs did not speak over the song intros and four songs were usually played in a row without interruption.  The format was syndicated by TM and was also picked up on other Greater Media FM stations including WMGQ in New Brunswick, New Jersey, in the New York City suburbs.

By 1987, the adult contemporary field in Detroit had become quite crowded.  In addition to WMJC, Detroit had WNIC, WOMC, WLTI, and WNTM, with WNIC and the oldies-based WOMC dominating in the format.  Greater Media later brought the "Magic" format and branding back to the Detroit market with WMGC-FM from 2001 to 2011 (that station currently airs a classic hip-hop format).

Classic Rock (1987-present 
On March 13, 1987, WCSX was launched, with Bob Seger's "Old Time Rock and Roll" as its first song. It was one of the first Classic Rock stations in the United States, and is also one of few nationwide to have endured with the classic rock format for several decades.

WCSX's most played bands are classic rock staples The Eagles, Fleetwood Mac, The Rolling Stones, Aerosmith and Tom Petty, along with hometown artist Bob Seger. WCSX generally takes a more mainstream, older-sounding approach to classic rock reminiscent of progressive and album rock radio of the 1970s, since sister station WRIF includes a good deal of harder classic rock titles in its playlist, including 1980s glam metal, which WCSX generally does not play.  WCSX competition includes WLLZ, owned by iHeartMedia, which returned to the format in January 2019 with a hard-edged sound, after once being Classic Rock WDTW-FM.

WCSX did briefly expand its playlist to harder classic rock in 1996-97 (bands like Rush, Van Halen, Def Leppard, etc.) when Greater Media bought then-recently defunct station WLLZ's library, but went back to its toned down approach when WWBR went to a harder classic-rock format. The station also had a short run of playing current songs from their mainstay artists, using the slogan; "It doesn't have to be old to be a classic".

Beasley ownership
On July 19, 2016, the Beasley Media Group announced it would acquire Greater Media and its 21 stations (including WCSX) for $240 million. The FCC approved the sale on October 6, and the sale closed on November 1.

WCSX kept its format through the sale and has continued as Detroit's classic rock leader under Beasley ownership.

HD programming
WCSX broadcasts using HD Radio technology.
In August 2005, WCSX launched its HD-2 digital subchannel with a "Deep Trax" format. In January 2014, the "Deep Trax" format was replaced "Detroit's Oldies 94.7 HD2", playing an oldies format.

On August 30, 2021, WCSX-HD2 changed its format from oldies to sports radio.  It uses programming from Fox Sports Radio and calls itself "The Roar".  The subchannel feeds two FM translators:  93.5 W228CJ in Detroit and 99.1 W256EA in Ecorse.

WCSX also has an HD-3 subchannel, which carries Christian Contemporary music from the Smile FM Network.  It feeds FM translator 103.9 W280EL in Yates, Michigan.

See also
Media in Detroit

References

External links

Michiguide.com - WCSX History

CSX
CSX
Classic rock radio stations in the United States
Radio stations established in 1976
1976 establishments in Michigan